Italy competed at the 1961 Summer Universiade in Sofia, Bulgaria and won 5 medals.

Medals

Details

References

External links
 Universiade (World University Games)
 WORLD STUDENT GAMES (UNIVERSIADE - MEN)
 WORLD STUDENT GAMES (UNIVERSIADE - WOMEN)

1961
1961 in Italian sport
Italy